Bootle (pronounced ) is a town in the Metropolitan Borough of Sefton, Merseyside, England, which had a population of  51,394 in 2011; the wider Parliamentary constituency had a population of 98,449.

Historically part of Lancashire, Bootle's proximity to the Irish Sea and the industrial city of Liverpool to the south saw it grow rapidly in the 1800s, first as a dormitory town for wealthy merchants, and then as a centre of commerce and industry in its own right following the arrival of the railway and the expansion of the docks and shipping industries. The subsequent population increase was fuelled heavily by Irish migration.

The town was heavily damaged in World War II with air raids against the port and other industrial targets. Post-war economic success in the 1950s and 1960s gave way to a downturn, precipitated by a reduction in the significance of Liverpool Docks internationally, and changing levels of industrialisation, coupled with the development of modern suburbs and the expansion of industries into the Merseyside hinterlands. By the 1980s, there had been a sharp spike in unemployment and population decline. Large-scale renewal projects have begun to help regenerate the local economy.

History

Toponymy
Etymologically, Bootle derives from the Anglo Saxon Bold or Botle meaning a dwelling.
It was recorded as Boltelai in the Domesday Book in 1086. By 1212 the spelling had been recorded as Botle. The spellings Botull, Bothull and Bothell are recorded in the 14th century. In the 18th century, it was known as Bootle cum Linacre.

Resort
Bootle was originally a small hamlet built near the 'sand hills' or dunes of the river estuary. In the early 19th century, it began to develop as a bathing resort, attracting wealthy people from Liverpool. Some remaining large villas which housed well-to-do commuters to Liverpool are located in the area known locally as 'Bootle Village'.

Development

The Liverpool, Crosby and Southport Railway arrived in the 1840s and Bootle experienced rapid growth. By the end of the 19th century the docks had been constructed along the whole of the river front as far as Seaforth Sands to the north. The town became heavily industrialised. Bootle was incorporated as a municipal borough in 1868 under the Municipal Corporations Act 1835, and in 1889 was granted the status of a county borough by the Local Government Act 1888, becoming independent from the administrative county of Lancashire. During this time period it was sometimes formally known as Bootle-cum-Linacre. Orrell was added to the borough in 1905. There are still large areas of Victorian terraced houses in Bootle, formerly occupied by dock workers. These are built in distinctive pressed red brick.

Bootle Town Hall and other municipal buildings were erected in the last quarter of the 19th century. The population of the town swelled during this period, boosted in large part by Irish immigration and the attraction of plentiful work on the docks. The wealth to pay for the splendour of the town hall and the gentrified 'Bootle Village' area was generated by these docks. The skilled workers lived in terraced houses in the east of the town, while the casual dock labourers lived in cramped, dwellings near the dockside. Stories about three streets in particular, Raleigh Street, Dundas Street and Lyons Street, caused great alarm. Lyons Street, the scene of the 'Teapot Murder', was renamed Beresford Street shortly before the First World War.

On the positive side, Bootle was the first borough to elect its own school board, following the passage of William Forster's Elementary Education Act 1870. In 1872 Dr R.J. Sprakeling was appointed the first Medical Officer of Health, and was instrumental in improving sanitary conditions in the town. The Metropole Theatre on Stanley Road played host to stars such as music hall singer Marie Lloyd.  Tree lined streets surrounded magnificent open spaces, such as Derby Park, North Park and South Park. Roman Catholic and Anglican churches sprang up all over the town, and Welsh immigration brought with it Nonconformist chapels and the temperance movement. Local societies thrived, including sports teams, scouts and musical groups. The Bootle May Day carnival and the crowning of the May Queen were highlights of the social year. The town successfully fought against absorption by neighbouring Liverpool in 1903. It subsequently made good use of its Latin motto Respice, Aspice, Prospice, ("look to the past, the present, the future").

Second World War
The docks made Bootle a target for Nazi German Luftwaffe bombers during the Liverpool Blitz of the Second World War, with approximately 90% of the houses in the town damaged.
Situated immediately adjoining the city of Liverpool, and the site of numerous docks, Bootle had the distinction of being the most heavily bombed borough in the UK.
Bootle played an important role in the Battle of the Atlantic.

Royal Navy's Captain Frederic John Walker, the famous U-boat hunter, would rest in the Mayor's Parlour of Bootle Town Hall and his ship, HMS Starling, sailed out of Bootle. Memorabilia associated with Walker included the ships's bell from HMS Starling which was given to Bootle Town Hall in October 1964.

Post-war
After the Second World War large council housing estates were built inland from the town centre, including the area of Netherton, which was built on new town principles. The Liverpool Overhead Railway and Liverpool Tramways Company closure in the 1950s reduced Bootle's connection to Liverpool.

Bootle did share in the postwar boom. The centre of the town was redeveloped and the 'Bootle New Strand' shopping centre was opened in the late 1960s. At the same time, new offices were built in the town centre. The town lost its access to the beach when neighbouring Seaforth Sands was redeveloped in the early 1970s, but the Seaforth Container Port brought new jobs into the area. The local authority, and other 'social' landlords, saw to it that new housing was built and older stock renovated. Bootle did not go down the route of massive housing clearance, and many local communities remained intact.

The borough celebrated its centenary in 1968 and civic pride was much in evidence.

Decline
The docks declined in importance in the 1960s and 1970s, and Bootle suffered high unemployment and a declining population. The establishment of large office blocks housing government departments and the National Girobank provided employment, filled largely by middle-class people from outside the Bootle/Liverpool area. In the early 1970s Bootle was absorbed into the new local authority of Sefton under local government reorganisation. More fundamental than political change was economic change. The very reason for Bootle's existence, the access to the Mersey, became almost irrelevant as the docks closed and the new container port required far fewer workers than the old docks had. This in turn affected practically every other industry in the town. The problems slowly gathered pace until Merseyside hit crisis point in the early 1980s. Even by 2006 the area was one of the poorest in the country and had high levels of unemployment.

Regeneration
Asda heavily invested in Bootle by building a new eco-friendly superstore on Strand Road in 2008. Among refurbishment and rebuilding projects in the 2010s, the HSE buildings and the new-look Stanley Road have been created, Oriel Road Station has been refurbished, and a new block of flats on the site of the Stella Maris building and a Lidl store on Stanley Road have been built. The Klondyke Esate located off Hawthorne road saw the Welsh terrace houses get demolished and replaced with 2,3 and 4 bed modern houses. This was after the controversial move by Bellway after residents opposed demolition. Sefton Council submitted a bid to the Government’s Levelling UP Fund in July for £20 million to underpin a regeneration scheme to transform Bootle town centre. The outcome of the fund is expected to be announced in 2023.

Unemployment
The economic recovery on Merseyside since the 1980s has meant that Bootle is ranked as only the tenth worst area for unemployment in Britain, and all other parts of the region have lower unemployment—a stark contrast to the 1970s and 1980s when areas of Merseyside dominated the list of Britain's least economically active areas. As of 2009, in the depth of a recession, unemployment stood at 12%. In 2022, it was reduced to less than 4%, similar to the national average.

Geography and administration
Bootle Docks was created as a part of the Mersey Docks and now promoted as Port of Liverpool, with the Liverpool and Wirral Docks, being located on both bank sides of the River Mersey. Bootle Docks are situated at the northern end, that is closer to the Irish Sea estuary.

Bootle, along with Southport, is one of the two main administrative headquarters for the Metropolitan Borough of Sefton. Among Bootle's neighbouring districts are Kirkdale to the south, Walton to the east, with Seaforth, Litherland and Netherton to the north. To the west it is bounded by the River Mersey. In the centre is a sizeable area of large office blocks, and the Leeds and Liverpool Canal.

The old civic centre of Bootle contains large Victorian buildings such as the town hall and the municipal baths. To the north lies the New Strand Shopping Centre, which gained notoriety after the abduction and murder of two-year-old James Bulger in 1993.

Sports

Bootle has one association football non-league team known as Bootle F.C. who currently play in the Northern premier League Division One West. They are a reformed version of the original Bootle F.C. (1879).

Education
The town has one further education college, Hugh Baird College, located on Balliol Road. The college delivers over 300 courses to more than 7,000 students with course levels from Entry Level to Level 3, A Levels, apprenticeships and university level courses and degrees.

In January 2014, a multimillion-pound facility called the L20 Building located on Stanley Road was opened. This houses a dedicated University Centre with open-plan study areas for students studying University level courses.

Transport

There are two railway stations served by frequent electric services from Liverpool to Southport. These are Oriel Road near the Victorian era civic centre, and New Strand, serving the shopping centre. A third railway station is situated on the boundary of Bootle (Old Roan), and is part of the Liverpool to Ormskirk Line. A goods line, the Bootle Branch, is still in use, but it used to be a passenger line which had a station at Bootle Balliol Road railway station and served the areas of Clubmoor, Tuebrook and Childwall among other places. It closed during the 1960s. Called the Canada Dock Branch, a second route, the North Mersey Branch could still be opened.

The bus station is under the New Strand Shopping Centre and provides services to Liverpool City Centre, Penny Lane, Allerton, Tuebrook and Crosby.

Bootle Docks used to host passenger ships to Belfast and Dublin, but now it is used solely for freight services, and it is somewhat less important than the port of Liverpool.

Amenities
The town has a leisure centre located in the North Park area, which includes a modern gym, swimming pool, and various indoor sports halls. The Bootle New Strand shopping centre contains many of the regular high street stores, combined with a smaller collection of local businesses. For entertainment there is a wide variety of public houses, snooker clubs and late night bars. There are also a number of restaurants.

Politics
Originally a Conservative seat, Bootle elected early MPs such as Bonar Law, a future Tory Prime Minister. The seat was briefly Liberal in the early 1920s. Labour first captured the seat in 1929, in the personage of local hairdresser John Kinley, but lost it in 1931. Although Kinley recaptured it in 1945 it did not become safely Labour until the long tenure of Simon Mahon. It is now impregnable, politically, and since 1997 the Bootle constituency has been one of the safest Labour Party seats in the whole of the United Kingdom. The area was represented in parliament by Joe Benton until he stood down in 2015. The current MP is Peter Dowd.

For elections to Sefton Council the town of Bootle is split between the electoral wards of Netherton and Orrell, whose three representatives, who are all members of the Labour Party, are Susan Ellen Bradshaw, Robert John Brennan, and Ian Ralph Maher. Derby, whose three representatives are Linda Cluskey and Carol Gustafson, who are members of the Labour Party, and Paul Larkin who is a member of the Liberal Democrats, and finally Linacre whose three representatives, who are all members of the Labour Party, are John Fairclough, Gordon Friel, and Doreen Kerrigan. Overall there are nine councillors representing the Bootle area, all of them are members of the Labour Party.
Overall the electoral wards of Sefton Council in and around Bootle and the parliamentary constituency itself are extremely safe seats for the Labour Party, sometimes standing uncontested by the other parties.

Expansion of Bootle Docks
Liverpool2 is an ambitious project with a total investment of up to £300 million to expand the port of Liverpool, creating a river berth near the "Seaforth Triangle" south of the Royal Seaforth Dock and is a primary part of the Mersey Ports Master Plan. The project has permission granted by the Secretary of State- Harbour Revision Order. Lend Lease is the contractor building the project.

When the new dock is completed, it will be able to accommodate two post-Panamax vessels of 13,500 TEU (Twenty-foot equivalent unit) simultaneously. The expansion of the docks includes the construction of a new deep water terminal which will eliminate the restriction in vessel size of the current docks. The project is estimated to involve  of concrete,  of new crane rails, and 15,000 steel piles.

Furthermore, the completion of the dock will allow the world's container ships to have direct connections to the northern half of the UK and Ireland, and is estimated to receive up to 4 million containers per year. The expansion of the Bootle Docks is expected to make a significant contribution to the community by adding £5 billion to the local economy and bringing an influx of employment opportunities. Liverpool Community College and Mersey Maritime have signed partnerships with Peel Port to perform job skills training, 5,000 direct and indirect jobs will be created, of which 4,000 will be at the Liverpool Port.
However, along with the benefits, the expansion of the port will have a severe impact on the environment
and local communities. Through the construction of the docks, a large number of vehicles will emit significant amounts of air pollutants leading to pollutant concentration in a small area. In addition to air pollution, increasing noise nuisance and vibrations are other problems causing concern. Once completed, the operation of the port will mean a considerably increase of road traffic, rail traffic and shipping, leading to reduced air quality and various issues affecting the health of the community.

Notable people

Many notable footballers were born in Bootle. Jamie Carragher, who played for LFC, is now a pundit for Sky, Steve McManaman and Roy Evans came to prominence playing for Liverpool (with Evans later going on to become the club's manager) whilst Alvin Martin is regarded as one of West Ham United's greatest-ever players. Former Evertonian Jose Baxter of Sheffield United was also born in Bootle. England Lioness and Manchester City player Alex Greenwood grew up playing on the streets of Bootle.

In the arts, Bootle has produced the comedian Tom O'Connor, the television presenter Keith Chegwin, television producer and presenter Will Hanrahan and early rock and roll singer Billy J. Kramer. The fashion retailer George Davies was educated in Bootle.

The linguist John C. Wells was born in Bootle.

Psychic medium Derek Acorah was born in Bootle.

The former Leader of the UK Independence Party, Paul Nuttall, was born in Bootle.

Sergiusz Pinkwart, writer, journalist, traveler, Magellan Award winner, lives in Bootle.

Pat Kelly, New Zealand trade unionist, was born and raised in Bootle.

Mayors

Charles Howson, 1869
Thomas P. Danson, 1870
William Geves, 1870–1874
George Barnes, 1874
Thomas P. Danson, 1875–76
Louis W. Heintz, 1877 (Conservative)
J. Newell, 1878 (Conservative)
John P. McArthur, 1879 (Conservative)
James Webster, 1882 (Liberal)
James Webster (Liberal, re-elected in November, 1883 supported by both Liberals and Conservatives)
James Leslie, 1884 (Liberal)
Matthew Hill, 1885 (Liberal)
William Jones, 1886 ("Klondike Bill")
John Wells, 1888
Benjamin Cain, 1889 (Liberal)
John Vicars, 1890–91
William Thomas, 1892
Benjamin Sands Johnson, 1893–1904
Isac Alexander Mack, 1895–96 (Liberal)
John McMurray, 1897
William Robert Brewster, 1898 (Conservative)
George Lamb, 1899 (Liberal)
Peter Ascroft JP, 1900 (Conservative but elected with unanimous cross-party support)
George Samuel Wild, 1901
William Henry Clemmey, 1902 (Conservative)
James Julius Metcalf, 1903
Owen Kendrick Jones, 1904 (son of William Jones, Mayor, 1886)
Robert Edward Roberts, 1905
Alfred Rutherford, 1906
James Person, 1907
George Randall, 1908
Hugh Carruthers, 1909
James Roger Barbour, 1910
John William Edwin Smith, 1911
William Henry Clemmey, 1912 (Conservative)
John Rafter, 1913
George Alexander Cassady, 1914
James Pearson, 1915
Benjamin Edward Bailey, 1916
James Pearson, 1917
Harry Pennington, 1918–19
John Henry Johnston, 1920–21
Thomas Alfred Patrick, 1922
Robert Turner, 1923
Birty Wolfenden, 1924
Thomas Harris, 1925
Frederick William King, 1926
Edmund Gardner, 1927–28
Simon Mahon, 1929, first Catholic Mayor of Bootle and father of MPs Peter and Simon Mahon.
Donald Samuel Eaton, 1930
Arthur Hankey, 1931
James Scott, 1932
Maurice Stanley Webster, 1933
Edwin Smith, 1934
John William Clark, 1935
James Burnie, 1936
James O'Neill, 1937
Nicholas Cullen, 1938
James Spence, 1939
Joseph Sylvester Kelly, 1940
James Stubbs Riley, 1941
Richard Owen Jones, 1942
George Alfred Rogers, 1943
William Keenan, 1944
John Thomas Hackett, 1945
Harry Oswald Cullen, 1946
Thomas Harris, 1947–48
C G Anderson, 1949
David Berger Black, 1950
Robert James Rogerson, 1951
Mark Connolly, 1952
R J Rainford, 1953
P Mahon, 1954
T A Cain JP, 1955
Dr I Harris JP, 1956
A S Moore JP, 1957
J C Hevey, 1958
Hugh Baird, 1959
Joseph Samuel Kelly, 1960
Joseph Sylvester Kelly, 1961
Simon Mahon Jr, 1962
J Morley, 1963
TE Dooley, 1964
G Williams, 1965
J Grimley, 1966
Veronica Bray, 1967
Oliver Ellis, 1968
H Gee, 1969
F Morris, 1970
G Halliwell, 1971
J Marray, 1972
Louis O'callaghan

See also
 Listed buildings in Bootle

References

External links

 Bootle Today

 
Liverpool Urban Area
Towns and villages in the Metropolitan Borough of Sefton
Towns in Merseyside
Unparished areas in Merseyside